Pruzhansky Uyezd (Пружанский уезд) was one of the subdivisions of the Grodno Governorate of the Russian Empire. It was situated in the central part of the governorate. Its administrative centre was Pruzhany.

Demographics
At the time of the Russian Empire Census of 1897, Pruzhansky Uyezd had a population of 139,074. Of these, 75.5% spoke Belarusian, 12.8% Yiddish, 6.7% Ukrainian, 3.0% Russian, 1.4% Polish, 0.3% German and 0.1% Tatar as their native language.

References

 
Uezds of Grodno Governorate
Grodno Governorate